Phoxinus brachyurus, also known as the Seven River's minnow, is a species of freshwater fish in the family Cyprinidae.

References

Phoxinus
Taxa named by Lev Berg
Fish described in 1912